Transcription factor SOX-6 is a protein that in humans is encoded by the SOX6 gene.

Function 

The SOX gene family encodes a group of transcription factors defined by the conserved high mobility group (HMG) DNA-binding domain. Unlike most transcription factors, SOX transcription factors bind to the minor groove of DNA, causing a 70- to 85-degree bend and introducing local conformational changes.[supplied by OMIM]

Interactions 

SOX6 has been shown to interact with CTBP2 and CENPK.

It has also been demonstrated that SOX6 protein accumulates in the differentiating human erythrocytes, and then is able to downregulate its own transcription, by directly binding to an evolutionarily conserved consensus sequences located near SOX6 transcriptional start site.

Sox6 appears to have a crucial role in the transcriptional regulation of globin genes, and in directing the terminal differentiation of red blood cells. In addition, SOX6 may have a role in tumor growth of Ewing sarcoma. A new role of Sox6 in renin and prorenin regulation was studied using a Sox KO mouse model in which Sox6 is only knockout in renin expressing cells. This study showed that renin promoter possesses the binding site for Sox6. The highlight of the study was that Sox6 is one of the key regulators of renin and prorenin regulation and JG cell expansion during low salt and dehydration in mice. PMID: 31760770; DOI: 10.1152/ajprenal.00095.2019

See also 
 SOX genes

References

Further reading

External links 
 

Transcription factors